Onno van de Stolpe (born 25 October 1959, Geldrop) is a Dutch businessman and is currently CEO of Galapagos NV, a drug discovery and development company. He will retire in April 2022.

Education
Van de Stolpe obtained an MSc degree from the Agricultural University in Wageningen (the Netherlands).

Career
Van de Stolpe began his career as Manager Business Development at MOGEN in Leiden. Afterwards, he worked for the Netherlands Foreign Investment Agency in California, where he was responsible for recruiting biotech and medical device companies to locate in the Netherlands.

When he returned to The Netherlands, Van de Stolpe founded Galapagos NV in 1999 when he was recruited by the CEO of Crucell to set up a new genomics division for the company. He launched the division in a join venture with Tibotec.

Since its inception, Van de Stolpe has grown Galapagos NV to almost 600 employees and is one of the largest biotechs in Europe by market cap.

Sources
 De Nederlandse durfal van Galapagos 
 Galapagos sluit overeenkomst met Eli Lilly

References

1959 births
Living people
Dutch corporate directors
Dutch businesspeople
Dutch chief executives
People from Geldrop
Wageningen University and Research alumni
20th-century Dutch people